Teleopsis amnoni is a species of stalk-eyed fly found in the Western Ghats of India. The species was described in 2019 and it is closely related to Teleopsis sykesii from which it can be distinguished by the clear tip to the wing apart from other characters. The species is known from Karnataka, Kerala and Maharashtra.

References 

Diopsidae